In mathematics and computer science, a splicing rule is a transformation on formal languages which formalises the action of gene splicing in molecular biology.  A splicing language is a language generated by iterated application of a splicing rule: the splicing languages form a proper subset of the regular languages.

Definition
Let A be an alphabet and L a language, that is, a subset of the free monoid A∗.  A splicing rule is a quadruple r = (a,b,c,d) of elements of A∗, and the action of the rule r on L is to produce the language

If R is a set of rules then R(L) is the union of the languages produced by the rules of R.  We say that R respects L if R(L) is a subset of L.  The R-closure of L is the union of L and all iterates of R on L: clearly it is respected by R.  A splicing language is the R-closure of a finite language.

A rule set R is reflexive if (a,b,c,d) in R implies that (a,b,a,b) and (c,d,c,d) are in R.  A splicing language is reflexive if it is defined by a reflexive rule set.

Examples
 Let A = {a,b,c}.  The rule (caba,a,cab,a) applied to the finite set {cabb,cabab,cabaab} generates the regular language caba∗b.

Properties
 All splicing languages are regular.
 Not all regular languages are splicing.  An example is (aa)∗ over {a,b}.  
 If L is a regular language on the alphabet A, and z is a letter not in A, then the language { zw : w in L } is a splicing language.
 There is an algorithm to determine whether a given regular language is a reflexive splicing language.
 The set of splicing rules that respect a regular language can be determined from the syntactic monoid of the language.

References 

 

Semigroup theory
Formal languages
Combinatorics on words